Charles Brownlow, 1st Baron Lurgan PC (17 April 1795 – 30 April 1847), was an Anglo-Irish politician who sat in the House of Commons from 1818 to 1832 and was raised to the peerage in 1839.

Life
Brownlow was the son of Lieutenant-Colonel Charles Brownlow and his wife, Caroline Ashe. His father's elder brother William Brownlow MP had died childless in 1815. He was educated at Trinity College, Dublin. 

In 1818 he was elected Member of Parliament for Armagh and held the seat until 1832. In 1829, the year of the Roman Catholic Relief Act 1829, Brownlow gave the Rev. W.O. O'Brien land for a church in the townland of Derry.  In 1833 he had built Brownlow House designed by the Edinburgh architect William Henry Playfair in the Elizabethan style and constructed of Scottish sandstone. He was High Sheriff of Armagh in 1834 and was raised to the peerage by Queen Victoria, as Baron Lurgan, of Lurgan in the County of Armagh, on 14 May 1839.

Brownlow  was keen to improve his estate and was actively concerned with the welfare of the people of Lurgan. During the Great Famine, Lord Lurgan, as he had become, was chairman of the Lurgan Board of Guardians and was constantly at his post.  While alleviating distress and attending the wants of the Union, he contracted typhus fever which led to his death at the age of 52.

Family
Brownlow married Lady Mary Bligh, daughter of The 4th Earl of Darnley and Elizabeth Brownlow, on 1 June 1822. He married as his second wife Jane Macneill, daughter of Roderick Macneill of Barra, on 15 July 1828. His son by his second wife, Charles Brownlow, succeeded him.

His daughter, the Hon Clara Anne Jane Brownlow (d.1883) married Col. William Macdonald Farquharson Colquhoun Macdonald of St Martins Abbey FRSE FRGS (1822-1893).

Arms

References

External links
 

1795 births
1847 deaths
Brownlow, Charles
Brownlow, Charles
Brownlow, Charles
Brownlow, Charles
Brownlow, Charles
Brownlow, Charles
UK MPs who were granted peerages
Barons in the Peerage of the United Kingdom
Members of the Privy Council of Ireland
Charles
Peers of the United Kingdom created by Queen Victoria
Alumni of Trinity College Dublin